The Princess Diaries, Volume X: Forever Princess is a young adult book in the Princess Diaries series.  Written by Meg Cabot, it was released on January 6, 2009 by Harper Collins Publishers.

The book was released in the UK on January 2, 2009, and called The Princess Diaries: Ten out of Ten.

Plot

Two years after the ninth book, Mia finds herself preparing for her 18th birthday party, her prom, and her high school graduation within the space of a week. She is in a stable relationship with J.P., has become good friends with Lana, and maintains a friendly email correspondence with Michael, but remains painfully estranged from Lilly, who is now dating Kenny. However, Mia is still attached to her bad habit of lying: though she tells everyone otherwise, she has been accepted into every college she applied for, due to her royal status. She also unsuccessfully tries to publish her senior project, a romance novel written under an alias, while telling her friends and family that the project is a paper on Genovian olive oil pressing. Adding to her anxieties, her father, Philippe, is running in the Genovian election for Prime Minister against her cousin, René, who is leading in the polls.

Having found immense success in Japan with the CardioArm, her ex, Michael, returns to Manhattan. He and Mia resume their friendship in person, and she soon finds herself questioning her rekindled feelings for him and her relationship with J.P. At Mia's birthday party, J.P. gives her a promise ring in front of all the guests, causing Michael to walk out. Mia accepts the ring, but begins to suspect J.P.'s motives: his senior project, a play about their relationship, reveals some of Mia's private secrets without her consent; he never reads her novels, and the paparazzi always seem to know when they are together. To make matters even more confusing, Michael donates a CardioArm to Genovia, and Lilly films a commercial in support of Prince Philippe, helping his election prospects. Nonetheless, she continues her relationship with J.P., planning on losing her virginity to him after prom.

Michael takes Mia on a carriage ride through Central Park to explain the motives for his donation. They end up making out, but she runs off before he can confess his love. Later he texts her while she is at therapy saying he still loves her and would wait for her. At prom, Lilly tells Mia that J.P. only dated her in sophomore year to get closer to Mia, and that they had slept together, contrary to his claims that he is a virgin. She also told Mia that J.P. was always calling the paparazzi on them so he could be (more) famous. Mia breaks up with him, puts a cease-and-desist on his play, and she and Lilly become friends again. Michael arrives at midnight to talk to Mia, and they go to his apartment, where it is implied that they have sex.

At her graduation party the next day, Mia learns that her father won the election by a landslide, and she announces to her parents and Grand-mère that she has picked Sarah Lawrence College (which was the college Grand-mère had wanted Mia to go to). She finds a publisher for her novel on her own merits, and she and Michael resume their relationship.

References

External links

 Meg Cabot chat transcript, 30 July 2006.  URL accessed 25 April 2006.
 Meg Cabot's Official Website
 Meg Cabot , URL accessed 27 August 2008
 Excerpt of 'The Princess Diaries, Volume X: Forever Princess'
 

2009 American novels
American young adult novels
The Princess Diaries novels
HarperCollins books